Iskandar "Dicky" Zulkarnaen (October 12, 1939 – May 10, 1995) was a prominent and award-winning Indonesian actor. He was the husband of Mieke Wijaya and father of Vanya "Nia" Zulkarnaen, both actresses.

External links

1939 births
1995 deaths
Indonesian male film actors
20th-century Indonesian male actors
Betawi people
People from Batavia, Dutch East Indies
People from Jakarta